Cyril Suk and Daniel Vacek were the defending champions but lost in the first round to Alex O'Brien and Sandon Stolle.

Grant Connell and Patrick Galbraith won in the final 6–3, 7–6 against Jacco Eltingh and Paul Haarhuis.

Seeds
Champion seeds are indicated in bold text while text in italics indicates the round in which those seeds were eliminated. The top four seeded teams received byes into the second round.

Draw

Final

Top half

Bottom half

External links
 1994 Volvo International Doubles draw

Doubles